Panteleyevo is a rural locality (a village) in Vakhnevskoye Rural Settlement, Nikolsky District, Vologda Oblast, Russia. The population was 22 as of 2002.

Geography 
Panteleyevo is located 65 km northwest of Nikolsk (the district's administrative centre) by road. Zelyonaya Griva is the nearest rural locality.

References 

Rural localities in Nikolsky District, Vologda Oblast